Olivia Lynn Moultrie (born September 17, 2005) is an American professional  soccer player for  Portland Thorns FC of the National Women's Soccer League (NWSL). In 2019, she became the youngest American women's soccer player to turn professional, at age 13, and in 2021, she became the youngest player to play an NWSL regular-season game, at age 15. She was also the youngest player to commit to a college team and accept a scholarship offer, which she ultimately gave up, at age 11. She became the youngest player in NWSL regular-season history to score a goal at age 16 against Houston Dash on June 12, 2022.

Early life
Moultrie was born in Utah to K.C. and Jessica Moultrie, and was raised in the Canyon Country district of Santa Clarita, California. She started training in soccer when she was four years old.  By fifth grade, she was homeschooled so that she could focus on soccer and became the first girl on a boys' club team to play in the U.S. Soccer Development Academy system. At 11, she accepted a full scholarship offer to play soccer for the University of North Carolina when she reached college age, becoming the youngest girls' soccer player to publicly accept a college offer at the time. She moved from California upon joining Portland Thorns FC in 2019, and now resides in Wilsonville, Oregon.

Club career

Portland Thorns
In February 2019, Moultrie announced that she was turning professional, having signed a representation deal with the Wasserman Media Group. She signed with Nike to a multi-year endorsement arrangement, giving up her college eligibility in the process, and joined the Portland Thorns FC academy.

Although she trained with the Thorns' senior team and appeared in exhibition matches, she had been prevented from signing a professional contract with the club, as the National Women's Soccer League (NWSL) prohibited players under age 18, while FIFA, soccer's international governing body, generally prohibits minors from playing overseas. She made her first appearance for the senior team in an exhibition match on March 27, 2019, against the United States under-23 team.

On May 4, 2021, she filed an antitrust lawsuit against the NWSL in the United States District Court for the District of Oregon, alleging that the league, as the "only acquirer of talent in the market", violated the Sherman Antitrust Act with its age limit. The suit asked for immediate action from the court by granting a temporary restraining order against the age rule so that Moultrie can play in regular-season games during the 2021 season. On May 24, 2021, United States District Judge Karin Immergut granted a temporary restraining order, ordering the league to lift its age limit and allow Moultrie to compete for a roster spot on the Thorns, writing, the league had not "presented any compelling procompetitive reasons to justify this anticompetitive policy, nor have they shown that eliminating the Age Rule will cause any non-speculative injury to the NWSL."

In June 2021, the league informed all member teams of a discovery process for Moultrie, ultimately awarding the rights to OL Reign, who subsequently traded her to the Thorns for a third-round draft pick. On June 30, 2021, Moultrie signed a three-year contract with the Thorns, becoming the youngest player to sign a contract with an NWSL team.

Moultrie made her professional debut on July 3, 2021, coming on as an 83rd-minute substitute in a 2–0 win against Racing Louisville. She made her first start and recorded her first assist on August 7 against Washington Spirit.

On August 19, 2021, Moultrie scored her first professional goal, a 57th-minute direct free kick against Houston Dash, in the semifinal of the International Champions Cup.

On June 12, 2022 Moultrie scored her first NWSL league goal becoming the youngest player to do so.

On October 29, 2022 Moultrie came on as a substitute in the 2022 NWSL Championship game. The Thorns won the match earning Moultrie her first NWSL Championship.

International career
On February 15, 2022, Moultrie was included in the U.S. under-20 squad for the 2022 CONCACAF Women's U-20 Championship.

In popular culture
In 2019, shortly after turning pro, Moultrie had a small role in Nike's all-women "Dream Crazier" commercial that debuted during the 92nd Academy Awards broadcast and was narrated by Serena Williams.

Honors and awards
Portland Thorns FC
 International Champions Cup: 2021
 NWSL Championship: 2022

United States U20

CONCACAF Women's U-20 Championship: 2022

References

External links 

 Official website

2005 births
Living people
Soccer players from Utah
Soccer players from California
People from Canyon Country, Santa Clarita, California
Sportspeople from Santa Clarita, California
Soccer players from Oregon
People from Wilsonville, Oregon
American women's soccer players
Women's association football midfielders
Portland Thorns FC players
National Women's Soccer League players
21st-century American women
United States women's under-20 international soccer players